Gribkovo is a rural locality (a settlement) in Podlesnoye Rural Settlement, Vologodsky District, Vologda Oblast, Russia. The population was 1,101 as of 2002. There are 16 streets.

Geography 
Gribkovo is located 17 km southeast of Vologda (the district's administrative centre) by road. Pervomayskoye is the nearest rural locality.

References 

Rural localities in Vologodsky District